Trail of Dreams: A Canadian Suite is a 2000 studio album by Oscar Peterson. The album is a suite dedicated to Peterson's native Canada, arranged by Michel Legrand.

Track listing
 "Open Spaces" – 7:13
 "Morning in Newfoundland" – 3:55
 "The Okanagan Valley" – 4:37
 "Dancetron" – 4:02
 "Ballad to P.E.I." – 3:00
 "Cookin' on the Trail" – 4:06
 "Banff the Beautiful" – 5:40
 "Lonesome Prairie" – 3:35
 "The French Fiddler" – 3:05
 "Harcourt Nights" – 5:12
 "Manitoba Minuet" – 5:25
 "Anthem to a New Land" – 2:33

All music composed by Oscar Peterson.

Personnel

Performance
 Oscar Peterson – piano
 Ulf Wakenius – guitar
 Niels-Henning Ørsted Pedersen – double bass
 Martin Drew – drums
 Michel Legrand – arranger, conductor

References

2000 albums
Suites (music)
Oscar Peterson albums
Albums arranged by Michel Legrand
Telarc Records albums